Division No. 7, Subd. D is an unorganized subdivision in eastern Newfoundland, Newfoundland and Labrador, Canada. It is in Division No. 7 on Bonavista Bay.

According to the 2016 Statistics Canada Census:
Population: 230
% Change (2011-2016): -0.9
Dwellings: 734
Area (km2.): 2,483.46
Density (persons per km2.): 0.1

Newfoundland and Labrador subdivisions